Khyrunnisa A. is an Indian author of children's fiction, speaker, academic and a columnist, who created the comic book character 'Butterfingers'. The character first appeared in the Indian children's magazine Tinkle. Thirteen-year-old Amar Kishen, aka Butterfingers, now features in the eponymous Butterfingers series of novels and short story collections published by Puffin, the children's imprint of Penguin Random House India.

She has written two books for adults so far. Her first, the bestselling Tongue in Cheek: The Funny Side of Life (2019) was published by Westland, and is a hilarious take on the misadventures of a modern urban woman. The second, Chuckle Merry Spin: Us in the U.S, also published by Westland, came out in September 2022. It is a humorous travelogue based on her trip to the U.S in 2018.

Her book of animal stories for young readers titled The Lizard of Oz and Other Stories, published by Scholastic, appeared at the same time. Another book of animal stories, The Crocodile Who Ate Butter Chicken For Breakfast and Other Stories, was published by Red Panda, the children’s imprint of Westland, on August 17, 2020. Shashi Tharoor had this to say about the book, 'Khyrunnisa's oeuvre now has some unique and lovely animal stories giving it the resonance of a Panchatantra for the contemporary world.'  

In February 2021, Baby and Dubdub, a warm and funny novella about the relationship between a boy, a dog and a baby, was published by Talking Cub, the children's imprint of Speaking Tiger.

Khyrunnisa's first three children's novels Howzzat Butterfingers! (2010), Goal, Butterfingers! (2012) and Clean Bowled, Butterfingers! (2015), were followed by three collections of short stories, The Misadventures of Butterfingers (2016), Run, It's Butterfingers Again! (2017) and Of Course It’s Butterfingers! (2018). All the Butterfingers books were launched by Shashi Tharoor, Member of Parliament. Smash It, Butterfingers! a rollicking badminton-based novel and the seventh in the Butterfingers series, came out in July 2021. This book was longlisted for the JK Paper and Times of India Auther Awards 2022 in the Children’s Literature category and also featured in Times of India’s top ten books for children 2021.

A book of her prize-winning stories, Lost in Ooty and Other Adventure Stories, was brought out by Unisun Publications in 2010. Some of her stories for children and for adults have appeared in anthologies published by Puffin, Children's Book Trust, Talking Cub and Unisun Publications. She writes stories regularly for the children's magazine, Dimdima, a Bhavan's publication.

‘Butterfingers,’ Khyrunnisa's entry for the Annual All India Tinkle Short story competition for adult writers of children's fiction in 1996, won her the second prize. She went on to win the first prize at the competition for the next seven consecutive years – from 1997–2003. In 2007, she won the prestigious Unisun Children's Fiction Award. She also has five Children's Book Trust prizes to her credit.

Personal life 
Khyrunnisa's parents, A.R. Bijli and Ayesha Bijli, settled down in Trivandrum as her father, a post master, believed that Trivandrum was the best place to provide his eight children, seven of whom were girls, with good education.

She continues to reside in Thiruvananthapuram, Kerala, with her husband P. Vijaya Kumar, a former professor of  English and the grandson of Mahakavi Kumaran Asan, who was one of the triumvirate poets of Kerala,a philosopher, a social reformer and a disciple of Sree Narayana Guru. They have one son, Amar Vijaykumar, an engineer, who is married to Arpitha Sridhara. The two are currently working in the USA. Their son Neil was born in Dallas on June 20, 2021.

Education 
Khyrunnisa did her schooling in Holy Angel's Convent Trivandrum, and her undergraduate studies in All Saints College and postgraduate as well as M Phil. in University College, Trivandrum. She was awarded the 3rd rank for BA English Literature in Kerala University.

Career 
Khyrunnisa worked as Associate Professor of English at All Saints’ College, Thiruvananthapuram. She was appointed  Management Trainee in Punjab National Bank and worked there for two years before resigning to take up a teaching job at All Saints’ College.

She was a columnist for The New Indian Express, writing on classics and well known works of fiction and for The Hindu where she had a popular fortnightly humour column, Inside View in The Hindu MetroPlus. She has freelanced for publications like Outlook Traveller, Manorama Year Book and Kerala Calling, among others.

Butterfingers 
The Butterfinger series revolves around the hilarious escapades of thirteen-year-old Amar Kishen, a class VIII student of the fictitious Green Park Higher Secondary School. Amar's slip-grip methods and his clumsy antics earned him the nickname Butterfingers.

Butterfingers, named after Khyrunnisa's son, Amar, first appeared in 2006 in Tinkle, a popular fortnightly Indian children's magazine, as a regular comic-strip character. The illustrations were by Abhijeet Kini, the Mumbai-based illustrator and graphic artist.

The popular Butterfingers series, published by Puffin, began with the novel, Howzzat Butterfingers! , In 2010. This humorous cricket-based book was followed in 2012 by Goal, Butterfingers!, a rollicking football-based adventure novel which also includes a socially relevant environmental theme. The third in the series, ‘Clean Bowled, Butterfingers! was published in 2015 and is another cricket-based novel with a hilariously farcical plot in which Amar and his friends invent a variation of cricket called ‘Crack It’ when the school’s cricket gear gets stolen. This game, played without cricket bats and balls, has its own absurd rules and generates immense fun.

The Misadventures of Butterfingers, the fourth book in the series, came out in 2016 and is a collection of short stories. It was followed by two collections of delightful short stories, Run! It's Butterfingers Again! in 2017 and Of Course It's Butterfingers! in 2018. In July 2021, a delightfully funny badminton-based novel, Smash It, Butterfingers! was published.

The books have received praise from different quarters. The late Mansur Ali Khan Pataudi, former Indian cricket captain and legend, wrote of Howzzat Butterfingers!: ‘What great fun! It brings back memories of my prep school days.’ The ace cricketer V.V.S. Laxman described Clean Bowled Butterfingers as an ‘exuberant mix of school, cricket and fun.’ Shashi Tharoor, writer, MP and diplomat, complimented Khyrunnisa ‘not just for creating Butterfingers, but for enriching Indian writing with world-class children’s literature.’ He also said that ‘Khyrunnisa's Butterfingers is a gift to the children of our nation!'

Bibliography

Children's books

Butterfingers

Smash It, Butterfingers! (2021) 
Of Course It’s Butterfingers!  (2018)
Run, It's Butterfingers Again! (2017)
The Misadventures of Butterfingers (2016)
Clean Bowled, Butterfingers!(2015)
Goal, Butterfingers! (2012)
Howzzat Butterfingers! (2010)

Others

Baby and Dubdub (2021)
The Crocodile Who Ate Butter Chicken For Breakfast and Other Stories (2020)
The Lizard of Oz and Other Stories (2019)
Lost in Ooty and Other Adventure Stories (2010)

Adults 

Chuckle Merry Spin: Us in the U.S (2022)
Tongue in Cheek: The Funny Side of Life (2019)

References

External links 
 Official Website
 Khyrunnisa A. at Penguin India

Indian women children's writers
Indian children's writers
Women writers from Kerala
21st-century Indian women writers
21st-century Indian writers
University of Kerala alumni
Living people
Year of birth missing (living people)
Indian humorists
Women humorists